Velleda Cesari (15 February 1920 – 4 May 2003) was an Italian fencer. She competed in the individual foil event at the 1948, 1952 and 1956 Olympics with the best achievement of seventh place in 1948. In 1960 she won a bronze medal in the team foil event.

References

External links
 

1920 births
2003 deaths
Italian female fencers
Olympic fencers of Italy
Fencers at the 1948 Summer Olympics
Fencers at the 1952 Summer Olympics
Fencers at the 1956 Summer Olympics
Fencers at the 1960 Summer Olympics
Olympic bronze medalists for Italy
Olympic medalists in fencing
Sportspeople from Bologna
Medalists at the 1960 Summer Olympics
20th-century Italian women
21st-century Italian women